Federico Gasperoni (born 10 September 1976) is a Sammarinese footballer and cyclist. He played as a goalkeeper with the San Marino national football team. He is one of the most capped players along with Mirco Gennari with 41 international caps.

He competed at the 2011 Games of the Small States of Europe in cycling taking 13th place in the road race. He also competed in the equivalent road races at both the 2013 Games of the Small States of Europe and the 2017 Games of the Small States of Europe.

References

External links

1976 births
Living people
Sammarinese footballers
San Marino international footballers
Association football goalkeepers
Sammarinese male cyclists
People from the City of San Marino